Zacharie Astruc (23 February 1833 in Angers – 24 May 1907 in Paris) was a French sculptor, painter, poet, and art critic.

He was an important figure in the cultural life of France in the second half of the 19th century, and participated in the first Impressionist exhibition of 1874 and also in the Exposition Universelle of 1900. As an art critic, writing primarily between 1859–72, he was a strong defender of Courbet, and was one of the first to recognize the talent of Manet. He also defended Monet, Whistler, Carolus-Duran, Fantin-Latour, and Alphonse Legros.

He appears in the famous painting of Henri Fantin-Latour, A Studio at Les Batignolles, where he is seated next to Manet, who is shown painting his portrait. Astruc is generally credited with titling Manet's painting Olympia since an excerpt from an Astruc poem was included in the catalogue entry with the piece when it was exhibited at the 1865 Salon.

Astruc was a hispanophile, well versed in the art and literature of Spain. After his own trip to Spain in 1864, he helped prepare the itinerary for Manet's only trip to Spain in 1865. Astruc helped to promote a widespread revival of interest in El Greco's paintings. Astruc was also a leading figure in the Japonism movement in France in the 1860s and '70s, publishing, among other writings, three pivotal articles on Japonism in the Parisian newspaper, L'Etendard, in 1867–68.

Works

References

External links

 

1833 births
1907 deaths
French art critics
19th-century French sculptors
19th-century French male artists
French male sculptors
20th-century French sculptors
20th-century French male artists
People from Angers
French male non-fiction writers